Macrocoma voeltzkowi is a species of leaf beetle found in Tanzania and the Democratic Republic of the Congo. It was first described from Mafia Island by Julius Weise in 1910.

References 

voeltzkowi
Beetles of Africa
Beetles of the Democratic Republic of the Congo
Insects of Tanzania
Beetles described in 1910
Taxa named by Julius Weise